CCGS Cape Spry  is a  lifeboat in the Canadian Coast Guard Service, stationed at Souris, Prince Edward Island.

Design
The vessel is powered by two Caterpillar 3196 diesel engines driving dual propellers. Its crew complement is four with two being officers.

Communication options include Bendix-King KY196 VHF AM, Ross DSC 500 VHF FM and Motorola Micom HF radios. The boat has an Anschutz Gyrostar II gyro and a Furtuno 1942 X Band radar system. Other electronic systems for this lifeboat include an ICAN Aldebaran II electric charting system, JMC DF5500 VHF depth indicator, Si-Tex Koden CVS 106 depth sounder, Magnavox MX400B global positioning system and a Comnav 2001 autopilot system

See also
 47-foot Motor Lifeboat

References

Notes

Citations

External links

 Canadian Coast Guard homepage

Cape-class motor lifeboats
2003 ships
Ships of the Canadian Coast Guard